The Switzerland women's junior national handball team is the national under-19 handball team of Switzerland. Controlled by the Swiss Handball Association it represents the country in international matches.

World Championship results
1989 – 13th place
1997 – 15th place
2022 – 8th place

References

External links
Official website
 

Women's handball in Switzerland
Women's national junior handball teams
Handball